Central Trust Co v Rafuse, [1986] 2 SCR 147 is a leading decision of the Supreme Court of Canada on liability of solicitors in negligence and breach of contract as well as the doctrine of discoverability under the Statute of Limitations.

Background
Jack Rafuse and Franklyn Cordon were solicitors hired by a company that had purchased the shares of Stonehouse Motel and Restaurant Ltd. The agreement of sale required that the purchasers take out a mortgage on the property and use the assets used as part of the purchase price of the shares. The solicitors had been retained in order to complete the mortgage transaction.

Eight years later, the creditor for the mortgage, Central Trust Co., initiated a foreclosure of the mortgage. The creditor, Irving Oil Ltd., tried to prevent the foreclosure by claiming the mortgage was invalid. The case went to the Supreme Court of Canada and in the decision of Central and Eastern Trust Co v Irving Oil Ltd, the mortgage was invalidated. Having lost the case, Central Trust brought an action against the lawyers for negligence and breach of contract.

In their defence, Rafuse and Cordon claimed:
that their liability, if any, was in contract only and not in tort;
that they had not been negligent, particularly in view of the conflicting judicial opinion on the question of the validity of the mortgage;
that there was contributory negligence on the part of the Nova Scotia Trust Company or those for whom it was responsible because of the approval of the mortgage loan and the instructions to the respondents by persons of legal training;
 that the contract between the Nova Scotia Trust Company and the respondents, having as its object an illegal transaction, was itself illegal and could not therefore be the basis of an action in damages; and
 the appellant's action was barred by The Statute of Limitations.

The issues before the Court were:
 Can a solicitor be liable to a client in tort as well as in contract for negligence in the performance of the professional services for which the solicitor has been retained?
 Were the respondent solicitors negligent in carrying out the mortgage transaction for the Nova Scotia Trust Company?
 Was there contributory negligence on the part of the Nova Scotia Trust Company or those for whom it was responsible?
 Is the appellant prevented from bringing its action because of the illegality of the mortgage?
 Is the appellant's action barred by The Statute of Limitations?

Reasons of the court
LeDain J wrote the reasons for the majority.

On the first issue, he held that the duty in tort and in contract are two entirely separate duties and can be held concurrently by a defendant.

On the limitations issue, it was held that the plaintiffs were not statute-barred from commencing an action. The commencement of the limitation period was postponed pursuant to the common law "discoverability principle": "A cause of action arises for purposes of a limitation period when the material facts on which it is based have been discovered or ought to have been discovered by the plaintiff by the exercise of reasonable diligence."

References

External links
 

Canadian tort case law
Supreme Court of Canada cases
1986 in Canadian case law